Lew is a village and civil parish about  southwest of Witney in the West Oxfordshire District of Oxfordshire, England. The 2001 Census recorded the parish population as 65.  Since 2012 the parish has been part of the Curbridge and Lew joint parish council area, sharing a parish council with the adjacent civil parish of Curbridge.

History
The village's place-name, recorded as Hlæwe in 984, means "tumulus" in Old English. Until the 19th century Lew was a township in the parish of Bampton. It became a separate ecclesiastical parish in 1857, called Bampton Lew. The parish was united with Bampton in 1917, and since 1976 has formed part of the benefice of Bampton with Clanfield. Lew was made a separate civil parish in 1866.

Parish church
The Church of England parish church of the Holy Trinity was designed in a 13th-century style by the architect William Wilkinson and built in 1841.

References

Sources

External links

Civil parishes in Oxfordshire
Villages in Oxfordshire
West Oxfordshire District